Phenix or Phénix may refer to:

Buildings
 Phenix Baptist Church, West Warwick, Rhode Island, formerly on the National Register of Historic Places
 Phenix Building (Chicago), an office building, demolished in 1957
 De Phenix, Marrum, a smock mill in Marrum, Friesland, Netherlands
 De Phenix, Nes, a smock mill in Nes, Friesland, Netherlands

Business
 Phenix (watches), a Swiss watch brand
 Phenix Works, a steel working factory in Flémalle-Haute, Liège, Belgium
 Phenix Cheese Company, maker of Philadelphia cream cheese acquired by Kraft Foods Inc. in 1928

Places in the United States
 Phenix, Indiana, an unincorporated community
 Phenix, Missouri, an unincorporated community
 Phenix, Virginia, a town
 Phenix City, Alabama
 Phenix Township, Henry County, Illinois

People
 Cindy Phenix (born 1989), Canadian artist
 Erin Phenix (born 1981), American former swimmer and 2000 Olympic champion
 George Perley Phenix (1864–1930), American university president, and educator
 Mike Phenix (born 1989), English retired footballer
 Perry Phenix (born 1974), former National Football League player

Other uses
 PHENIX, a high-energy nuclear interactions experiment held at Brookhaven National Laboratory
 Phénix, French prototype fast breeder reactor in the Marcoule nuclear site
 Phénix, the French word for the phoenix (mythology), an immortal bird in Greek mythology
 "Phenix", a song by Sentenced from the album Amok
 Phenix (album) a 1975 album by jazz saxophonist Cannonball Adderley
 Phenix Aviation Phenix, a Spanish autogyro design
 Phenix High School, Elizabeth City County, Virginia
 , a French Navy submarine commissioned in 1932 and lost in 1939
 Quebec Phenix, a defunct professional women's ice hockey team

See also
Fenix (disambiguation)
Penix, an English surname
Phoenix (disambiguation)